The 2017 Texas–Permian Basin Falcons football team represented University of Texas of the Permian Basin in the 2017 NCAA Division II football season. They were led by second-year head coach Justin Carrigan. The Falcons play edtheir home games at Ratliff Stadium and were members of the Lone Star Conference. The 2017 season was the second season in the program's history.

Schedule

Texas-Permian Basin announced its 2017 football schedule on March 24, 2017. The schedule consists of five home and away games, including one neutral site game in the regular season. The Falcons will host LSC foes Angelo State, Midwestern State, Tarleton State, and Texas A&M-Kingsville and will travel to Eastern New Mexico, Texas A&M-Commerce, West Texas A&M, and Western New Mexico.

The Falcons will host one of the three non-conference games against Sul Ross from the American Southwest Conference and will travel to Lamar from the Southland Conference and will play Quincy from the Great Lakes Valley Conference in Miami, Oklahoma on the campus of Northeastern Oklahoma A&M College.

References

Texas-Permian Basin
Texas–Permian Basin Falcons football seasons
Texas-Permian Basin Falcons f